William Brooke may refer to:

William Brooke, 10th Baron Cobham (1527–1597), English peer and MP for Hythe and Rochester
William Brooke (1565–1597), English MP for Rochester and Kent. Son of above. Killed in duel.
William Brooke (MP, died 1643) (1598–1643), English soldier and politician
William Henry Brooke (1772–1860), English artist
Willie Brooke (1895–1939), trade union administrator and politician
Will Brooke, Chief of Staff to Senator Burns
Will Brooke (businessman) (born 1957), Alabama businessman and political candidate

See also
William Brooks (disambiguation)
William Brooke O'Shaughnessy (1808–1889), Irish physician
William Broke, English academic administrator